The 44th Grand Bell Awards ceremony was held at the Sejong Center for the Performing Arts in Seoul on June 8, 2007, and hosted by Kim Ah-joong and announcer Yoo Jung-hyun.

Nominations and winners 
(Winners denoted in bold)

References

External links 
 

Grand Bell Awards
Grand Bell Awards
Grand Bell Awards